Vasily Vasilyevich Vakhrushev (28 February 1902 in Tula, Russian Empire – 13 January 1947 in Moscow) was a Soviet and Russian statesman who was from 1939 to 1940 the Chairman of the Council of People's Commissars of the Russian SFSR, literally meaning Premier or Prime Minister. Vakhrushev also was a "key figure" for KGB operations in the United Nations in New York City.

His ashes were buried at the Kremlin Wall Necropolis.

References

1902 births
1947 deaths
People from Tula, Russia
Central Committee of the Communist Party of the Soviet Union members
First convocation members of the Supreme Soviet of the Soviet Union
Second convocation members of the Supreme Soviet of the Soviet Union
Heads of government of the Russian Soviet Federative Socialist Republic
Heroes of Socialist Labour
Recipients of the Order of Lenin
Recipients of the Order of the Red Banner of Labour
Soviet military personnel of the Russian Civil War
Burials at the Kremlin Wall Necropolis